Arne Tuft (January 16, 1911 – June 23, 1989) was a Norwegian cross-country skier who competed in the 1932 Winter Olympics.

He was born in Hønefoss and died in Oslo.

In 1936 he finished sixth in the 50 km competition.

Arne Tuft was the grandfather of Canadian cyclist Svein Tuft

Cross-country skiing results
All results are sourced from the International Ski Federation (FIS).

Olympic Games

World Championships

References

External links
 profile

1911 births
1989 deaths
Norwegian male cross-country skiers
Olympic cross-country skiers of Norway
Cross-country skiers at the 1936 Winter Olympics
People from Ringerike (municipality)
Sportspeople from Viken (county)